Burn in Hell may refer to:

 "Burn in Hell" (Judas Priest song), from Jugulator
 "Burn in Hell", a song by Twisted Sister from Stay Hungry

See also 
 Burning Hell, an album by Brainbombs
Burning Hell, a song by John Lee Hooker from self-titled album.
 The Burning Hell, a 1974 film by the evangelist Estus Pirkle
 The Burning Hell (band), a Canadian indie band
 "Liar Liar (Burn in Hell)", a song by The Used from Lies for the Liars
 "All Burn in Hell", a song by White Lion from Fight to Survive